Australian Dance Theatre (ADT), known as Meryl Tankard Australian Dance Theatre from 1993 to 1999, is a contemporary dance company based in Adelaide, South Australia, established in 1965 by Elizabeth Cameron Dalman . The ADT was the first modern dance company in Australia, and drew on the techniques of Martha Graham for its inspiration.

The company has garnered many industry awards, was the first Australian company invited to the Edinburgh Festival, and is the only Australian company to be invited to perform at Théâtre de la Ville in Paris. The company has toured performances extensively throughout Australia as well as internationally.

 the artistic director of the company is Daniel Riley, who took over after Garry Stewart had spent 22 years at the helm.

History
The Australian Dance Theatre was founded by Elizabeth Dalman (later Elizabeth Cameron Dalman ) in 1965. Dalman sought to "open the horizons for provocative contemporary and cutting edge dance". The ADT was the first modern dance company in Australia, and drew on the techniques of Martha Graham for its inspiration. Eleo Pomare was an early collaborator and the songs of Peter, Paul and Mary featured strongly in their early works, such as "This Train".

Dalman remained artistic director until 1975. Several directors followed, including Leigh Warren, who took the reins from 1987 to 1993.

Under Meryl Tankard as artistic director from 1993 to 1999, the company was known as the Meryl Tankard Australian Dance Theatre. Tankard left after disputes with the Board. After an interim directorship under Bill Pengelly, Garry Stewart was appointed in 1999.

In May 2021 Convergence was performed at the ADT's home base, the Odeon Theatre, Norwood. Supported by the Tanja Liedtke Foundation, this series of short performances brought together the work of three winners of the International Choreographic Competition Hannover: Philippe Kratz (2018 winner, Germany); Oscar Buthelezi (2019 winner, South Africa); and Tu Hoang (2020 winner, Vietnam); of the newly formed South Australian First Nations Dance Collective (who danced to the music of Electric Fields); and of Barkandji woman Adrianne Semmens, a member of the SAFNDC and associate artist of ADT for 2021. Despite the COVID-19 pandemic, South Australia, being free of the virus at that time, was able to play to 100% capacity. The performance was well-reviewed.

Wiradjuri man Daniel Riley, who spent 12 years with Bangarra Dance Theatre and then time as a lecturer in contemporary dance at the Victorian College of the Arts, took over as artistic director at the end of 2021. Riley is the first Indigenous person to become an artistic director of a non-Indigenous dance company in Australia. This responsibility weighs heavily on him, but he was inspired by playwright Wesley Enoch, the first Indigenous artistic director of a major theatre company, at Queensland Theatre. Before his appointment he had performed and choreographed extensively in Australia and internationally. While at Bangarra, he was the youngest male in the company to choreograph a work, creating a work called Riley, which paid tribute to the work of Aboriginal artist Michael Riley, to whom he discovered he was related, as second cousin. He has also choreographed for QUT, Third Row Dance Company in the UK, Sydney Dance Company, and Louisville Ballet. Riley met ADT founder Elizabeth Dalman when he was at school in Canberra, aged 13, although did not know about the ADT until they toured Canberra a few years later. He has since remained friends with Dalman and they talk often.  

Riley believes in an evolutionary rather than revolutionary approach, and is dedicated to creating shows that "can only be made here [on Kaurna country], not making work that looks like it's been made by a European company". 

The new season and troupe, with four new dancers, were unveiled in March 2022. The first performance under Riley was Outside Within, a triptych of works that explores Aboriginal and post-colonial Australia, with the first of the three, Immerse, choreographed by Adrianne Semmens. This was followed by a short film made in 2021 featuring Riley and his son, called Mulumna-Within; and then Riley’s first dance work choreographed by him for the company, The Third (May 2022)

In September 2022 Riley presented his first major work, at the Dunstan Playhouse in the Adelaide Festival Centre, called SAVAGE. The performance included nine dance students from Flinders University/AC Arts along with the ADT dancers.

Governance and funding
The ADT is funded by the federal government through the Australia Council, the Government of South Australia through the Department of the Premier and Cabinet (1997–2018 via Arts South Australia) and a number of corporate partners and sponsors, as well as private donors.

Artistic directors
The artistic directors have been:
1965–1975: Elizabeth Cameron Dalman 
1977–1985: Jonathan Taylor (former dancer Ballet Rambert, UK),
1986–1987: Anthony Steel (Adelaide Festival & Lenny Westerdijk (ADT dancer)
1987–1993: Leigh Warren (creator and director of Leigh Warren & Dancers, 1993–2019, now Dance Hub SA)
1993–1999: Meryl Tankard (left after disputes with the Board)
1999: Bill Pengelly (interim)
1999–2021: Garry Stewart
2022–: Daniel Riley

Tours
The company has toured performances extensively throughout Australia, as well as Ireland, Korea, Canada, USA, UK, The Netherlands, Germany, France, Belgium, Monaco, Japan, Spain, Austria, Italy, Luxembourg, Portugal, Norway and Colombia.

Accolades
ADT has garnered 28 industry awards since 2002, was the first Australian company invited to the Edinburgh Festival and is the only Australian company to be invited to perform at Théâtre de la Ville in Paris.

International Centre for Choreography

The International Centre for Choreography (ICC) at the ADT, supported by the Tanja Liedtke Foundation, was founded around 2016. It fosters choreographic initiatives locally and internationally, including residencies and other opportunities at ADT for the winners of the International Choreographic Competition Hannover (for which Garry Stewart has been on the judging panel). Its mission is "to facilitate open research and experimentation in a supportive and professional environment". Other initiatives of the ICC include dance workshops, discussion panels, collaborations, and screen dance projects.

Selected performances

Choreographed by Dalman:
Hallucinations (1966)
This Train (1966)
Landscape (1967)
Sundown (1967)
Sun and Moon (1968)
Homage to Boticelli (1969)
Creation (1969),
Release of an Oath (1972)

Choreographed by Taylor:
Wildstars
Transfigured Night

Choreographed by Tankard:

Songs with Mara
Kikimora
Furioso (1993)
Aurora (1994)
Possessed (1995)
Rasa (1996), (in collaboration with Padma Menon)
Seulle (1997)
Inuk (1997).
1998 (sub-titled A Sampler by Meryl Tankard)

Choreographed by Pengelly:
Split

Choreographed by Stewart:
Split (August 1999)
House Dance (New Year's Eve 1999), featuring six dancers abseiling down the outside of the Sydney Opera House
Birdbrain (2000)
The Age of Unbeauty (2002)
Nothing (2004)
Held (2004), a collaboration with U.S. dance photographer Lois Greenfield 
Devolution  
G (2008)
Be Your Self (2010) 
Worldhood (2011), with the Adelaide Centre for the Arts
Proximity (2012)
Objekt (October 2016), with tanzmainz
The Beginning of Nature (March 2016), with the Zephyr Quartet, performed at Womadelaide

Choreographed by Riley:
The Third, the third piece in a trilogy called Outside Within, and Riley's first for the company
SAVAGE (September 2022)

References

Further reading

. Australia Dancing (Archived page)

External links

 "Daniel retraces his path to ADT and outlines his vision for the company."

Dance companies in Australia
Contemporary dance companies
Performing arts in Adelaide
Performing groups established in 1965
1965 establishments in Australia
Dance schools in Australia